Akram Hadji Djahnit (born 3 April 1991) is an Algerian football player who currently plays for USM Alger in the Algerian Ligue Professionnelle 1.

Club career

ES Sétif
Born in Sétif, Djahnit began his career in the youth ranks of his hometown club ES Sétif. In 2010, he was a member of Sétif under-20 team that won the Algerian Junior Cup, beating CR Belouizdad 12-11 in the penalty shoot-out in the final after the game had ended 0-0. On 18 June 2011 Djahnit made his professional debut for the club as a starter in a league match against AS Khroub. A week later, on 25 June 2011, he scored his first goal for ES Sétif in a 3-1 loss to CA Bordj Bou Arréridj.

Al-Arabi SC
In July 2015, Djahnit signed a two-year contract with Kuwaiti club Al-Arabi. He scored his first goal in a 1-0 win versus Al-nasr in the league on 11 November 2015. In January 2016, Djahnit reached a mutual agreement with Al-Arabi to terminate his contract.

ES Sétif
After terminating his contract with Al-Arabi, Djahnit returned to his former club ES Sétif.

USM Alger
On 22 August 2022, former ES Sétif captain Akram Djahnit has just signed with USM Alger for the next two seasons as the Latest recruits, Djahnit decided to submitting his case to the National Dispute Resolution Chamber which agreed with him, therefore terminating his contract.

International career
On 23 September 2011 Djahnit was called up by Azzedine Aït Djoudi to the Algerian Under-23 National Team for a two-week training camp at the Algerian Football Federation's training facilities in Sidi Moussa. He has 1 cap for the team.

Honours
ES Sétif
 Algerian Ligue Professionnelle 1 (4): 2011–12, 2012–13, 2014–15, 2016–17
 Algerian Cup: 2012
 CAF Champions League: 2014
 CAF Super Cup: 2015
 Algerian U20 Cup: 2010

References

External links
 DZFoot.com Profile
 

1991 births
Algerian Ligue Professionnelle 1 players
Algerian footballers
ES Sétif players
Living people
Algeria under-23 international footballers
Footballers from Sétif
Al-Arabi SC (Kuwait) players
Algerian expatriate footballers
Expatriate footballers in Kuwait
Algerian expatriate sportspeople in Kuwait
Association football midfielders
Kuwait Premier League players
21st-century Algerian people
Algeria A' international footballers
2022 African Nations Championship players